François Kamano (born 1 May 1996) is a Guinean professional footballer who plays as a striker or left winger for Russian club Lokomotiv Moscow and the Guinea national team.

Club career

Bastia
Kamano made his professional debut with Bastia on 9 August 2014 in a 3–3 home draw against Marseille, replacing Christopher Maboulou for the last 8 minutes. His first goal came on 20 December, putting Bastia ahead in an eventual 1–1 draw at Caen. He finished his first season with four goals in 24 games, and was sent off on 9 May 2015, in the first half of a 1–0 win at Rennes.

At the start of the following season, Kamano received two straight red cards in losses at Saint-Étienne and Lyon. He scored three goals, all in home and away 2–1 wins over Rennes; his brace at Roazhon Park in the final game on 14 May 2016, he ensured the 10th place for the Corsicans.

Bordeaux
In July 2016, Kamano signed a four-year contract with Bordeaux, after previous trials with AIK, Villarreal, and Rennes and interest from Guingamp. The reported transfer was €2.5 million plus bonuses. On 26 October 2016, he made his Bordeaux debut in a 2–0 Coupe de la Ligue win against Championnat National side Châteauroux, also scoring his debut goal in the same game. On 30 October 2016, he made his league debut in a 0–0 away draw against Olympique Marseille. On 6 November 2016, he scored his first league goal for Bordeaux in a 2–1 home win against Lorient. Later that month, on 27 November 2016, he scored his first brace for Bordeaux in a 3–2 home win against Dijon, his first, a header in the 88th minute from a corner from Jaroslav Plašil and his second, a tap-in in the third minute of added time from a deflection off Jérémy Ménez's shot. In his debut season, Kamano got 17 starts in 30 games selected, providing four assists and netting in six goals. Playing largely on the left-hand side, he helped Bordeaux finish 6th in the league and qualify for next season's UEFA Europa League.

Kamano made his Europa League debut on 27 July 2017, playing full 90 minutes in both the legs of the third qualifying round match against Videoton. Bordeaux won the first leg 2–1 but bowed out of the tournament in the second leg after losing on away goals. At the end of the 2017–18 Ligue 1 season, he helped Bordeaux to another 6th-place finish, scoring 8 goals in the process, and thus qualifying for another Europa League season. On 2 August 2018, he scored his debut goal in the Europa League in the 2nd leg of the second qualifying round match against Ventspils. On 20 September 2018, he made his Europa League group stage debut in a 1–0 away loss against Slavia Prague. On 8 November 2018, he scored his first goal in the Europa League group stage in a 1–1 home draw against Zenit Saint Petersburg. Bordeaux was not able to advance to the next round after finishing third in the group stage.

Lokomotiv Moscow
On 17 August 2020, Kamano moved to Russian club Lokomotiv Moscow for a reported transfer fee of €5.5 million and signed a long-term contract. In his first season, he helped Lokomotiv to win the 2020–21 Russian Cup, he scored a goal in each of the four rounds the club played in, including the opening goal in a 3–1 final victory over Krylia Sovetov Samara on 12 May 2021. He also became a joint-top scorer of the cup with teammate Fyodor Smolov.

International career
On 6 July 2013, Kamano made his national team debut in a 3–1 2014 CHAN qualification defeat against Mali. On 30 December 2014, he was named in coach Michel Dussuyer's 23-man squad for the 2015 Africa Cup of Nations in Equatorial Guinea. He made two late substitute appearances for the quarter-finalists. On 12 June 2015, he scored his first ever senior international goal in a 2–1 defeat against Swaziland in the 2017 Africa Cup of Nations qualifiers.

On 13 June 2019, he was named in Guinea's 23-man squad for the 2019 Africa Cup of Nations in Egypt. On 22 June 2019, he scored in his sides 2–2 opening match draw against Madagascar. Kamano scored from the spot, after Ibrahima Traoré was fouled inside the box, he was later subbed out in the 78th minute for Fodé Koita.

Honours

Club
Lokomotiv Moscow
Russian Cup: 2020–21

Career statistics

Club

International

International goals
As of match played 1 September 2021. Guinea score listed first, score column indicates score after each Kamano goal.

References

External links
Bordeaux profile 

1996 births
Sportspeople from Conakry
Living people
Guinean footballers
Guinea international footballers
Association football forwards
SC Bastia players
FC Girondins de Bordeaux players
FC Lokomotiv Moscow players
Ligue 1 players
Championnat National 3 players
Russian Premier League players
2015 Africa Cup of Nations players
2019 Africa Cup of Nations players
Guinean expatriate footballers
Expatriate footballers in France
Guinean expatriate sportspeople in France
Expatriate footballers in Russia
Guinean expatriate sportspeople in Russia